The 1670s BC was a decade lasting from January 1, 1679 BC to December 31, 1670 BC.

Events and trends
 c. 1674 BC—End of Middle Kingdom in Ancient Egypt. Start of the Second intermediate period, the 15th–17th Dynasties.
 Egypt—Start of the Fifteenth Dynasty.
 1674 BC—Hyksos invade Egypt.

Significant people
 1677 BC—Death of Terah, father of Abraham, according to the Hebrew Calendar
 1675 BC—Death of Niqmi-Epuh, Great King of Yamhad, according to the Middle chronology

References